The Boarmiini (also often called Cleorini) are a large tribe of geometer moths in the Ennominae subfamily.

Description and systematics
This family is sometimes massively expanded, with the closely related Bistonini, Bupalini, Erannini, Gnophini, Melanolophini, Phaseliini and Theriini all merged into it. The eggs of all these geometer moths have the chorion cells characteristically arranged in longitudinal rows. The eggs of the Boarmiini in the narrow sense usually have a typical slender and narrow shape, with a soft chorion consisting of heavy-walled but unridged polygonal cells. However, in Cleora for example, the eggs approach the wide-walled shape found in many Bistonini. Adding further to the uncertainty is the fact that the Alsophilinae, usually treated as a small subfamily in their own right, might be a specialized lineage of Boarmiini; though their caterpillars are quite different, their pupae have a peculiar T-shaped cremaster which very much resembles that of the Boarmiini.

Boarmiini in the narrow sense are typically slender geometer moths that rest with the wings spread out flatly and do not tuck the hindwings under the forewings while at rest. Typically, they are cryptically colored and rather dark, with brownish-grey hues predominating; in many, there are two or three weak wavy bands extending across the wings and forming a rough semicircle when the moths are at rest. Though they all look quite similar in habitus, there are few unequivocal characters that can be easily used to recognize adult members of this tribe. The females of many species have a conspicuously long ovipositor for hiding away the typical soft-shelled eggs. The valva and harpe (or "clasper") of the male genitalia are highly complex in almost all species and often bear various extensions. The juxta is typically well-developed, large and extended. Their caterpillars are rarely plump, and apparently at least some mimic twigs or thin leaves.

Selected genera

As numerous ennominae genera have not yet been unequivocally assigned to a tribe, the genus list is preliminary.

In addition, the genera Acrodontis and Xerodes (usually placed in Ennomini), as well as Monocerotesa (usually in Macariini) are placed in the Boarmiini by some authors. "Boarmia" penthearia however appears to belong to the Macariini.

The fossil Lithopsyche was long assigned to the Boarmiini, but more recently a restudy indicated that it is a misidentified true butterfly (Papilionoidea).

In 2019, the first geometrid caterpillar in Baltic amber was discovered by German scientists. It was described as the earliest evidence for the subfamily of Ennominae, particularly the tribe of Boarmiini.

References

  (2008): Family group names in Geometridae. Retrieved 2008-JUL-22.
  (1994): The Moths of Borneo: Family Geometridae, Subfamily Ennominae. London.
  (2008): Markku Savela's Lepidoptera and some other life forms: Ennominae. Version of 2008-MAR-08. Retrieved 2008-JUL-21.
  (2008): Characterisation of the Australian Nacophorini using adult morphology, and phylogeny of the Geometridae based on morphological characters. Zootaxa 1736: 1-141. PDF abstract and excerpt

External links